Brignola is a surname. Notable people with the surname include:

Enrico Brignola (born 1999), Italian footballer 
Nick Brignola (1936–2002), American jazz baritone saxophonist